Petar Dragan Turković (also credited as Petar Dragutin; 4 April 1855 – 2 April 1916), known as Baron Petar Dragan Turković of Kutjevo, was a Croatian businessman and nobleman from the Turković Kutjevski family.

Biography 
After gymnasium in Rakovec, Turković attended the Trade Academy in Trieste. Even as a young man, he had a managing role in his father's forest business. In 1882, Turković permanently settled in Kutjevo and continued his work on wooden products, the wood industry and building a family business. According to tradition, he entered his father's business at the end of the 1870s. In 1886, Turković managed the family business with his younger brother Milan, devoting himself mainly to exploiting oak trees and planting extensive vineyards, orchards and tobacco.

In 1894, Turković moved to Zagreb to deal with the administrative affairs of the Turković family estate. In addition, he had other essential roles in Zagreb. He was a member of the board of directors of the Zagreb Plinara and Tvornica kože, and the president of brewery Zagrebačka pivovara and Hrvatska eskomptna banka. Turković was the founder of Zagrebačka pivovara together with Count Gustav Pongratz. His career peaked when he became the grand prefect of Zagreb County, where he was from 1906 to 1907. In 1911, together with his brother Milan, he became a baron.

Three years after his death, his sons founded the Turković Brothers Bank. The bank went liquidated after World War II. Also, the Peter Dragan Baron Turković Foundation went established by his son Vladimir in his name and on his brother's behalf under the patronage of Matica hrvatska.

Family 
Turković's wife was Marina Maja, née Tulić. They had three sons; Vladimir (born 1878), Davorin (b. 1883), and Velimir (b. 1894). His great-grandson is a clinical psychologist, Petar Turković, and his great-great-granddaughter is a singer-songwriter, Nika Turković.

Legacy 
Draganlug, a village in the Čaglin Municipality, was named after Turković.

References 

1855 births
1916 deaths
Austro-Hungarian businesspeople
Barons of Croatia
Croatian Austro-Hungarians
Croatian bankers
Croatian businesspeople
People from Karlovac
People from the Kingdom of Croatia-Slavonia
Turković family
20th-century Croatian politicians